Mendoan is a type of fried food that comes from the residency of Banyumas, Central Java, Indonesia. The word mendoan comes from the Banyumasan language word Mendo which means half-cooked or mushy; mendoan means cooking with much hot oil quickly so the cooking is not properly completed. Mendoan is often made of Tempeh and tofu.

See also

 Javanese cuisine

References 

Indonesian cuisine